Lily Ki (born November 20, 1991), better known as LilyPichu, is an American internet personality. She is a member of OfflineTV, an online social entertainment group of content creators and was one of the most subscribed female Twitch streamers during her time on the platform, where she won a Streamer Award. In July 2022, Ki  signed an exclusive deal with YouTube and would stop her activity on Twitch. She also provides voice-work for several characters in anime series and video games.

Early life
Ki was born on November 20, 1991 in Queens, New York City, New York. She is of Korean descent and has a brother named Daniel. She grew up in a musical household and began playing the piano at a young age. She also had an interest in art and illustration. She attended a community college.

Career

Ki's content includes gaming, art, and music. She first gained popularity in 2011 when her parody song "I'll Quit LoL" went viral on YouTube. In 2015, she made her musical debut with the release of her extended play Lilies. In July 2017, a video of Ki playing the melodica to unsuspecting cosplayers at Indy PopCon also went viral, becoming her most viewed YouTube video to date. That same month, she joined OfflineTV, an online social entertainment group of content creators. In September 2018, Riot Games launched a series of ads on YouTube for League of Legends which featured Ki and other content creators.

Ki was the fifth most watched female Twitch streamer in 2020. In 2020, she was nominated for the Shorty Award for Twitch Streamer of the Year. That same year, she appeared in an advertisement for 5 Gum. In 2021, Ki appeared in the music video for Bella Poarch and Sub Urban's song "Inferno", where she cameoed alongside several other content creators. At the 1st Streamer Awards in 2022, Ki was nominated for Best League of Legends Streamer and Best Music Streamer, winning for the latter.

In July 2022, it was announced that Ki had signed exclusively with YouTube and will no longer stream on Twitch. Ki explained her reasons for the change citing financial stability and a desire for a change of space.

Personal life
In 2018, Ki began dating YouTuber Albert Chang, better known as Sleightlymusical, and in 2019, they separated after he had an affair. In March 2020, Ki confirmed on a livestream that she and fellow OfflineTV member Michael Reeves were in a relationship.

On June 27, 2020, Ki and Yvonne "Yvonnie" Ng came forward with sexual misconduct allegations against former OfflineTV member Federico "Fedmyster" Gaytan, stating that he would enter her room uninvited and make inappropriate advances on her. Gaytan was removed from the group following the allegations, and in the week following his removal, six members of OfflineTV came forward with stories of his inappropriate and manipulative behavior.

Discography

Extended plays

Singles

As a lead artist

As a featured artist

Filmography

Film

Television

Video games

Music videos

Awards and nominations

References

1991 births
Living people
American people of Korean descent
Twitch (service) streamers
American voice actresses
Women video bloggers
21st-century American women
YouTube streamers
Streamer Award winners